Love, Lust & Lies: An Audio Novel is the fifteenth studio album by American singer-songwriter Will Downing, released by Concord Music Group on September 14, 2010.

Critical reception

Thom Jurek of AllMusic praised Downing's songwriting and production on the album.

Singles
"Glad I Met You Tonight" was released as the lead single from the album on August 24, 2010.

Track listing

Charts

References

2010 albums
Will Downing albums